The men's hammer throw at the 1938 European Athletics Championships was held in Paris, France, at Stade Olympique de Colombes on 4 September 1938.

Medalists

Results

Final
4 September

Participation
According to an unofficial count, 8 athletes from 5 countries participated in the event.

 (2)
 (2)
 (2)
 (1)
 (1)

References

Hammer throw
Hammer throw at the European Athletics Championships